Jonah Barrington MBE (born 29 April 1941) is a retired Irish/English squash player, originally from Morwenstow, Cornwall, England.

A Cornish-born Irish squash player, Barrington won the British Open (which was considered to be the effective world championship event before the World Squash Championships began) six times between 1967 and 1973, and was known as "Mr. Squash".

Barrington attended Headfort School (County Meath, Ireland), Cheltenham College, and spent two years at Trinity College Dublin.
The six-time British champion came from an old Anglo-Irish family. Jonah now coaches Egyptian world no.1 and 2015 British Open champion Mohamed El Shorbagy. One of his ancestors, Sir Jonah Barrington, established an estate in County Limerick called "Glenstal", which was eventually sold in the 1930s to a group of Belgian Benedictine monks who established a boarding school.

In 1982 Barrington co-authored the book Murder in the Squash Court: the Only Way to Win.

He has coached Israeli squash player Daniel Poleshchuk.

Barrington is the father of professional squash player and commentator Joey Barrington.

British Open titles

Books
1982, Murder in the Squash Court: The Only Way to Win (with Angela Patmore), London: S. Paul;

References

External links

 
 Sunday Times article 4 April 2010
 

1941 births
Living people
British squash players
Irish male squash players
People from Morwenstow
People educated at Cheltenham College
Sportspeople from Cornwall